A cloth face mask is a mask made of common textiles, usually cotton, worn over the mouth and nose. When more effective masks are not available, and when physical distancing is impossible, cloth face masks are recommended by public health agencies for disease "source control" in epidemic situations to protect others from virus laden droplets in infected mask wearers' breath, coughs, and sneezes. Because they are less effective than N95 masks, surgical masks, or physical distancing in protecting the wearer against viruses, they are not considered to be personal protective equipment by public health agencies. They are used by the general public in household and community settings as protection against both infectious diseases and particulate air pollution.

Cloth face masks were routinely used by healthcare workers starting from the late 19th century until the mid 20th century.  In the 1960s they fell out of use in the developed world in favor of disposable surgical masks with an electret (electrically charged) filter material, but cloth masks persisted in developing countries. During the COVID-19 pandemic, their use in developed countries was revived due to shortages, as well as for environmental concerns and practicality. Launderable cloth electret filters were also being developed.

Usage 

Prior to the COVID-19 pandemic, reusable cloth face masks were predominantly used by healthcare workers in developing countries and were especially prominent in Asia.  Cloth face masks contrast with surgical masks and respirators such as N95 masks, which are made of nonwoven fabric formed through a melt blowing process, and are regulated for their effectiveness based upon efficiency of minimum particle size filtered and/or maximum penetrating particle (MPP) size, along with other criteria such as outer splash/spray protection, inner splash/spray absorption, contaminant accumulation and shedding, air flow, and inflammability. Like surgical masks, and unlike respirators, cloth face masks do not provide a seal around the face, and prior to the 2019 COVID-19 outbreak were generally not authorized by institutions for protection from sub-HEPA particle size (less than 0.3 um) Influenza Like Illness (ILI).

In healthcare settings, they are used on sick patients as source control to reduce disease transmission through respiratory droplets, and by healthcare workers when surgical masks and respirators are unavailable. Cloth face masks are only recommended for use by healthcare workers as a last resort if supplies of surgical masks and respirators are exhausted.   They are also used by the general public in household and community settings as perceived protection against both infectious diseases and particulate air pollution and to contain the wearer's exhaled virus laden droplets.

Several types of cloth face masks are available commercially, especially in Asia.   Homemade masks can also be improvised using bandanas, T-shirts, handkerchiefs, scarves, or towels. But depending on the situation, reusable cloth masks with incorporated filters can block particles nearly as well as medical-grade masks can, as long as they fit securely.

Recommendations 

The World Health Organization (WHO) recommends that cloth face masks should be worn in public where social distancing is not possible to help stop the spread of coronavirus. It notes that wearing a cloth face mask is just one of a range of tools that can be used to reduce the risk of transmission.  The US Center for Disease Control, along with Johns Hopkins University School of Medicine, The Mayo Clinic, and Cleveland Clinic all concur with this recommendation. The World Health Organization also recommended that those aged over 60 years old or with underlying health risks require more protection and should wear medical masks in areas where there is community transmission.

The World Health Organization recommends using masks with at least three layers of different materials. Two spunbond polypropylene layers are also believed to offer adequate filtration and breathability. When producing cloth face masks, two parameters should be considered: filtration efficiency of the material and breathability.
The filter quality factor known as "Q" is commonly used as an integrated filter quality indicator. It is a function of filtration efficiency and breathability, with higher values indicating better performance. Experts recommend Q-factor of three or higher.

A peer-reviewed summary of the filtration properties of cloth and cloth masks concluded that, pending further research, evidence is strongest for 2 to 4 layers of plain weave cotton or flannel, at least 100 thread count.  A plain-language summary of this review is available.

Effectiveness 
Cloth face masks can be used for source control to reduce disease transmission arising from the wearer's respiratory droplets, but are not considered personal protective equipment for the wearer as they typically have very low filter efficiency. There are no standards or regulation for self-made cloth face masks.

As of 2015, there had been no randomized clinical trials or guidance on the use of reusable cloth face masks.  Most research had been performed in the early 20th century, before disposable surgical masks became prevalent.  One 2010 study found that 40–90% of particles in the 20–1000 nm range penetrated a cloth mask and other fabric materials. The performance of cloth face masks varies greatly with the shape, fit, and type of fabric, as well as the fabric fineness and number of layers.  As of 2006, no cloth face masks had been cleared by the U.S. Food and Drug Administration for use as surgical masks. A Vietnamese study of healthcare workers compared influenza-like illness outcome among those wearing cloth masks versus medical masks. They concluded that cloth masks were ineffective at preventing transmission in high-risk clinical settings. Although discouraged in clinical settings, cloth masks may still serve a useful role in reducing disease transmission in public settings according to a systematic review.

The primary role of masks worn by the general public is to "stop those who are already infected broadcasting the virus into the air around them." This is of particular importance with the COVID-19 pandemic, as silent transmission seems to be a key feature of its rapid spread.  For example, of the people on board the Diamond Princess cruise ship, 634 people were found to be infected—52% had no symptoms at the time of testing, including 18% who never developed symptoms. It is important to note that mask wearers are more likely to engage in other hygiene measures such as hand washing and social distancing. Best practice is to implement multiple prevention techniques to reduce risk, as characterized by the Swiss cheese model.

Compared with bacteria recovery from unmasked volunteers, a mask made of muslin and flannel reduced bacteria recovered on agar sedimentation plates by 99%, total airborne microorganisms by 99%, and bacteria recovered from aerosols (<4 µm) by 88% to 99%. In 1975, 4 medical masks and 1 commercially produced reusable mask made of 4 layers of cotton muslin were compared. Filtration efficiency, assessed by bacterial counts, was 96% to 99% for the medical masks and 99% for the cloth mask; for aerosols (<3.3 µm), it was 72% to 89% and 89%, respectively.

An experiment carried out in 2013 by Public Health England, that country's health-protection agency, found that a commercially made surgical mask filtered 90% of virus particles from the air coughed out by participants, a vacuum cleaner bag filtered out 86%, a tea towel blocked 72% and a cotton t-shirt 51%—though fitting any DIY mask properly and ensuring a good seal around the mouth and nose is crucial.  The use of common fabrics in making face masks has been tested. Filter efficiency can be improved with multiple layers, high weave density, and a mix of different types of fabrics. Cotton is the most commonly used material, and filter efficiencies can reach >80% for particles <300 nm with fabric combinations such as cotton-silk, cotton-chiffon, or cotton-flannel. The most protective cloth masks need at least three layers with a hydrophilic inner layer (e.g. cotton) to absorb moisture from the wearer's breathing and hydrophobic outer layers (e.g. polyester). Masks should be cleaned after each use. They can either be laundered or hand-washed in soapy hot water and dried with high heat.

History 

In Roman times, Pliny the Elder recommended that miners use animal bladders to protect against inhaling lead oxides. Some followers of Jainism, which originated in India around 500 B.C.E, wear cloth masks to avoid accidentally inhaling insects as part of practicing ahimsa. In the 16th century, Leonardo da Vinci advised the use of a wet woven cloth to protect against toxic agents of chemical warfare. In the early modern period, the plague-doctor costume included a beaked face-mask worn to protect the wearer from infectious "miasma".

Conventional cowboy attire in the American West often included a bandanna, which could protect the face from blown dust and also potentially doubled as a means of obscuring identity.

In 1890 William Stewart Halsted pioneered the use of rubber gloves and surgical face masks, although some European surgeons such as Paul Berger and Jan Mikulicz-Radecki had worn cotton gloves and masks earlier. These masks became commonplace after World War I and the Spanish flu epidemic of 1918. Cloth face masks were promoted by Wu Lien-teh in the 1910–11 Manchurian pneumonic plague outbreak, although Western medics doubted their efficacy in preventing the spread of disease.

Cloth masks were largely supplanted by modern surgical masks made of nonwoven fabric in the 1960s, although their use continued in developing countries.  They were used in Asia during the 2002–2004 SARS outbreak, and in West Africa during the 2013–2016 Ebola epidemic. Compared with bacteria recovery from unmasked volunteers, a mask made of muslin and flannel reduced bacteria recovered on agar sedimentation plates by 99%, total airborne microorganisms by 99%, and bacteria recovered from aerosols (<4 µm) by 88% to 99%. In 1975, 4 medical masks and 1 commercially produced reusable mask made of 4 layers of cotton muslin were compared. Filtration efficiency, assessed by bacterial counts, was 96% to 99% for the medical masks and 99% for the cloth mask; for aerosols (<3.3 µm), it was 72% to 89% and 89%, respectively.

COVID-19 pandemic 

During the COVID-19 pandemic, most countries recommended the use of cloth masks to reduce the spread of the virus.

On June 5, 2020, WHO changed its advice on face masks, recommending that the general public should wear fabric masks   where widespread COVID-19 transmission exists and physical distancing is not possible (for example, "on public transport, in shops or in other confined or crowded environments"). A synthesis of literature in a 2020 pre-print concluded that "The preponderance of evidence indicates that mask wearing reduces the transmissibility per contact by reducing transmission of infected droplets in both laboratory and clinical contexts. Public mask wearing is most effective at stopping spread of the virus when compliance is high".

See also 
 Nose filter

References

External links 
 CDC Mask Guidance – Help Slow the Spread
 NPR: 3 Tips for Safer Face Masks
 Mayo Clinic expert on nonmedical mask use to prevent public transmission

Cloth masks
History of medicine
Medical masks
Air filters
Infection-control measures
2020s fashion